Belmont is an unincorporated community in the town of Mount Holly in Rutland County, Vermont, United States. Belmont is about six miles west of the village of Ludlow.

References

Unincorporated communities in Vermont
Unincorporated communities in Rutland County, Vermont